Thomas Schmid (born 29 March 1959) is a German sailor. He competed in the Finn event at the 1988 Summer Olympics.

References

1959 births
Living people
Sportspeople from Hamburg
German male sailors (sport)
Olympic sailors of West Germany
Sailors at the 1988 Summer Olympics – Finn